Siavash Mirshams Shahshahani (Persian: سیاوش میرشمس شهشهانی) (born 1942) is an Iranian mathematician. He is a professor of mathematics and head of Mathematical Sciences Department at Sharif University of Technology.  He headed up the IRNIC registry for the .ir ccTLD until his retirement from that position in late 2008.  He has also served as a director of APTLD (the Asia Pacific Top Level Domain Association) between 2007 and his retirement from that position in February 2009.

Education
Shahshahani completed his PhD under the supervision of Stephen Smale at the University of California at Berkeley in 1969. He has since devoted a substantial part of his career to mathematical education.

Books

External links
 Siavash Shahshahani Homepage at Mathematics Department of Sharif University of Technology
 
 Siavash Shahshahani at ICANNWiki
 APTLD homepage

21st-century Iranian mathematicians
Academic staff of Sharif University of Technology
University of California, Berkeley alumni
1942 births
Living people
Iranian Science and Culture Hall of Fame recipients in Mathematics and Physics
20th-century Iranian mathematicians